The 1937 Vanderbilt Commodores football team represented Vanderbilt University during the 1937 college football season. The Commodores were led by Ray Morrison, who served in the third season of his second stint, and fourth overall, as head coach.  Vanderbilt went 7–2 with losses to Georgia Tech and Alabama.  Members of the Southeastern Conference, the Commodores went 4–2 in conference play. They played their five home games at Dudley Field in Nashville, Tennessee.  A hidden ball trick helped Vanderbilt defeat LSU in its first-ever victory over a ranked opponent.

Schedule

References

Vanderbilt
Vanderbilt Commodores football seasons
Vanderbilt Commodores football